Patball is a non-contact competitive ball game played in many forms using one's hands or head to hit the ball against a wall – the objective being to get the succeeding player out. The game is popular in school playgrounds during break-time. Patball is played with a tennis ball, or other similar-sized specific patball, and the preferred hand, rather than any form of racquet or bat, similar to wallball. The hand is used to "pat" the ball at the wall or at the opponent with the objective of making the ball un-returnable, similar to squash. Variations of the game include the use of the foot -'footies' or 'Devils' touch'; a semi-contact rule popularised at Coopers Technology College.

It is very popular among London public schools, most notably, private schools such as Dulwich College and Dulwich Hamlet.

Game

Patball, in most forms, is played by two opposing players, but multiple players at once are possible depending on space restrictions. It is played against walls of a various widths, with the exact areas usually agreed upon based on age, space availability and a size which will allow continuous play rather than repeated restarts or "second serves".

Only the players' hands may hit the ball and different shots and skills are employed to avoid the opponent being able to return the shot, at which point the opposing player is out or loses a life depending on the game version being played.

The ball used is usually a standard tennis ball, but at Dulwich College, a specific patball. This is a hollow rubber ball purchased from the school commissariat which can best be described as a tennis ball without the fibrous felt. 

Recently, new variants of patball have been invented such as 'Aces', 'Kingpin' and 'Single Dingles'. Aces is played with four players on a special court (eight equally sized squares painted on the ground) and each player uses one square. It is played just as the original version, except for the fact that the wall is on the opponent's court and "lives" are used, varying on who is playing. When a player runs short of lives, he/she becomes a "ghost". A ghost is still allowed to play but cannot lose lives or make players still in the game lose lives. When just two players remain, each player gets four of the eight squares each and continues with the number of lives that they had prior to this. The players continue playing until one of the two is knocked out. 

Kingpin consists of three to eight players. Much like aces you play on the ground but once you lose the point you go to the back and the aim is to become the king, who starts the rally every point. the positions are in order; King, Queen, 1st Jock / Bishop, 2nd Jock / Bishop, 3rd Jock / Bishop, 4th Jock / Bishop, 5th Jock / Bishop and 6th Jock / Bishop. The game ends when the end of break/lunch bell goes. Up to Twelve players could play (King, Queen, Jack and playing cards from 10 down) with 9 being a common court configuration (King in the middle). The king bounced the ball in his square and onto someone else's. If the ball double bounced, was missed or went out of court, the player was out and demoted to the bottom square.

Single Dingles is played like Kingpin but with two people and it is winner stays on.

Rules

The rules of Patball will vary slightly across different areas, but these are the generally accepted rules for a standard game.

General gameplay

Two players or more can play at any one time. An order is decided for the players, where – in chronological order – the succeeding player will attempt to shoot.
The first player serves by throwing the ball to the floor near the wall, making it bounce and hit the wall.
The second player lets the ball bounce once after hitting the wall, before hitting it to the floor again so it bounces onto the wall and back to the next player. 
This continues until one player misses the ball and fails to return it to the other player or hits the wall directly without letting the ball bounce (produces a "direct"). The player that failed to hit it back is out and a new "half-round" begins with the players that are not yet out (if the game consists of more than two players).
When the final two players (if there were other players as well) are left, they compete in rounds where the winner is declared out of two points. In some instances, the final round does not have to go through the "out-of-two" phase. Instead, the final players can decide the winner out of one point.
If the players decide to start a completely new round, the order is based on the players that were out first being last, e.g. if there were five players competing, the first player to get out would be fifth in the order.
 In some variations aces will be allowed and in this instance, a serve which is un-returnable will result in an automatic elimination for the receiver.

Event rules

When the ball hits an object or a person before the returning player has a chance to hit it, "obs" (see the section Language, below) is declared. If a consensus is reached in that it was "obs", the round is restarted with the player that declared "obs" serving. The game-play and rules are often changed by the players. For example, some players would not allow the shooting technique of hitting the ball onto the wall without a bounce - but others could eliminate that rule so that the shooting player can hit the ball right before the bounce occurs. In any instance where the ball goes in a wild direction due to an odd surface, named "curbs" or a "dodgy bounce", a re-throw takes place. If the second player dislikes the first player's serve, they can declare a "second serve", and the first player has to re-serve. The first player can declare a "second serve" as well if they wish to. This can be thought to be useful to the first player because the first player cannot get out on the first serve.

Point-scoring patball

Patball is sometimes played with a point scoring system where the winner of each round gets a point and the person with the most points at the end is victorious, e.g. the players go through a specific number of rounds, e.g. out of ten. The players have to keep track of their points. This is often known in Dulwich College as "Aces".

Language

Patball uses a jargon language within the game, with a fairly large number of terms and usages. These jargon languages occur in many sports but Patball's jargon is very notable and commonplace.

The main terms, which vary across different areas of the game, are in the following glossary:

See also 

 Wallball (children's game)

References

Sources
 Patball at Streetgames.co.uk
 

Ball games